Jadwiga Vuyk, née Jadwiga Reich Rosenblatt (1886 – 1950) was a Polish-Dutch art dealer and art historian.

Vuyk was born in Łódź and married the Dutch banker Pieter Vuyk in Edmonton in 1912, whom she divorced in 1930. She had already moved to Amsterdam with her daughter Margueritha Vuyk in 1927. She is known for publications on Dutch masters, most notably Anthonie Blocklandt van Montfoort and Jacobus Storck.

Vuyk died in Amsterdam.

Works
 Zwei Altarflügel von Anthonie Blocklandt van Montfoort, in Oud Holland, 45, 1928 pp. 159–176
 Les dessins hollandais du XVIesiècle dans la collection Degrez du Musée de Bruxelles: I. Quatre dessins de Cornelis Cornelisz de Harlem, in Oud Holland, 46, 1929 pp. 214–221
 Anthonie Blocklandt van Montfoort, II, in Oud Holland, 46, 1929 pp. 106–114
 Anthonie Blocklandt van Montfoort, III, in Oud Holland, 48, 1931 pp. 72–82
 Contribution to Mélanges Hulin de Loo, Essays written in honour of G. Hulin de Loo, edited by Paul Bergmans. With a portrait, 1931
 Ein Frauenbildnis von Blocklandt van Montfoort, in Oud Holland, 48, 1931 pp. 142–143
 Johannes of Jacobus Storck of Sturck?, in Oud Holland, 52, 1935 pp. 121–126
 Catalogus grafische kunst in Polen, 1948

References 

Jadwiga Vuyk in image database records of the RKD

1886 births
1950 deaths
Writers from Łódź
Dutch women writers
Polish emigrants to the Netherlands